Shake It... is Australian band Endorphin's fifth studio album, released in late 2004.

Track listing
"Shukran" - 4:04
"To the Rhythm" - 3:29
"Love Is a Dancefloor" - 3:32
"Yeah Man" - 3:48
"Strong Hearts" - 3:27
"Over and Over" - 5:04
"Rewind" - 3:46
"Rocking with the People" - 4:00
"Truce" - 3:26
"The Night Is Calling" - 3:28
"Shake It" - 3:35
"Mirage" - 6:53
"Inside Your Mind" - 4:03

External links
 [ Shake It...] at allmusic

2004 albums
Endorphin (Australian band) albums